The Szeged-Hódmezővásárhely Tram-train is a tram-train system in Hungary between two of the most important cities of Csongrád-Csanád County, Szeged (the county seat) and Hódmezővásárhely (a city with county rights). Construction began on 4 April 2018, and it was inaugurated on 29 November 2021.

History 
Many commute between the two cities during the school days, 60% of which by public transport. The cities are connected by regional buses and a train service that runs by the hour. The distance between the two bus stations is 26,2 km (16,2 miles) and the journey takes about 30–37 minutes (depending on the number of stops the bus has to take). Because of the traffic jams caused by the number of vehicles and the number of passengers, most buses are up to 10 minutes late.

There is also a train service between Szeged and Hódmezővásárhely provided by a fleet of diesel trains, however this system is poorly operated as there is only one track available with the trains running on an hourly basis with a maximum speed of 80 km/h (50 mph).

In 2007, a plan was made for the Szeged Transport Ltd. and by 2016 permission for construction was given.

The project 
The goal of the project is to create a modern, frequent, easy and fast mean of public transport between the two cities. The system is planned to connect with the old Szeged-Békéscsaba railway, tram line 1 in Szeged and there's also planning of creating a brand new tram system in Hódmezővásárhely the tram-train can connect with.

Route 

 Szeged pályaudvar
 Galamb utca
 Bécsi körút
 Aradi vértanúk tere
 Somogyi utca
 Széchenyi tér
 Anna-kút
 Rókusi templom
 Tavasz utca
 Damjanich utca
 Vásárhelyi Pál utca
 Pulz utca
 Rókus vasútállomás
 Algyő
 Hódmezővásárhelyi Népkert
 Strandfürdő
 Hősök tere
 Kossuth tér
 Kálvin János tér
 Hódmezővásárhely vasútállomás

Fleet 
In 2017, MÁV-START (a subsidiary of MÁV for passenger transport) ordered a tender for a fleet of hybrid diesel-electric tram-trains that would run on the system. This ended on February 8, 2017 with Stadler winning with its Stadler Citylink trams. The first vehicle was delivered by Stadler Rail Valencia in January 2021 with the last ones planned to arrive until the end of the year. A maintenance depot is under construction at the Szeged-Rendező station.

Criticism 
The project received most of the criticism for its budget overruns. In 2017 János Lázár, former mayor of the town of Hódmezővásárhely criticized the National Infrastructure Developing Company (NIF Zrt.) for letting the price tag go up from the 23,5 billion HUF (approx. EUR 64 million) estimated in the feasibility study to 71 billion HUF (approx. EUR 193 million), as of 2017, mostly due to the price increase on the railway line reconstruction that costs 48,5 bln HUF. However, Lázár continued to support the project as the member of the government.

References

Tram transport in Hungary
Railway lines opened in 2021
2021 establishments in Hungary